Mittal v/s Mittal is a 2010 Bollywood drama film written and directed by Karan Razdan and produced by Rajeev Kore and Dinesh Chugh. The film documents a case that strongly advocates for the rights of women who are subjugated to domestic violence and inhuman treatment. The film, starring Rohit Roy and Rituparna Sengupta, released on 26 March 2010 to mixed critical reviews and proved to be a box office failure.

Plot
Mitali, a successful model, meets Karan, the Mittal scion, the heir to one of the richest families in the country. Mitali‘s simple, middle-class upbringing is in complete contrast to Karan's  super-brat lifestyle. But Karan got smitten by Mitali. Being accustomed  to getting what he wants in life, Karan landed up at Mitali's home with his parents with a marriage proposal. Delighted at their daughter's luck, Mitali's family approves the match and they both get married.

It was not long before Mitali's dreams turned into her worst nightmare. Her mother-in-law started loathing her and became instrumental in creating misunderstandings between Karan and her. Karan turned out to be a puppet in his mother's hands and her father-in-law was nothing but a helpless, mute spectator. Karan has a certain pattern of dealing with women and wanted to subdue Mitali's independent frame of mind. He who appeared to be a loving husband was in fact a violent monster at night within the privacy of their bedroom. Unable to bear the humiliation and pain after she resisted his advances and being raped by him, Mitali decided to take charge of her life. She decided to fight back and walked out of her in-laws home. By hiring a lawyer and filing a case against her husband, she started her own battle against discrimination and domestic violence. Karan retaliated by hiring the best lawyer that money can buy to defend himself.

Cast
 Rohit Roy as Karan Mittal
 Rituparna Sengupta as Mitali Mittal
 Gulshan Grover as Harish Salunke
 Suchitra Krishnamoorthi as Karuna Maheshwari
 Dolly Thakore as Karan's Mother
 Amar Talwar as Karan's Father
 Reema Lagoo as Mitali's Mother
 Anjan Srivastav as Mitali's Father
 Iravati Harshe as Ramola
 Hazel Crowney as Special appearance for item song

Soundtrack
The music was composed by Shamir Tandon and released by T-Series.

References

External links
 
 Mittal v/s Mittal at Bollywood Hungama
 Official Website

2010 films
2010s Hindi-language films
Films directed by Karan Razdan
Films about pornography
Indian drama films
2010 drama films